James Inglis was a British/Canadian psychologist.

Career
Inglis trained in clinical psychology in Scotland, where he met and married the architect Lily Inglis. They moved to Canada in 1959, where James Inglis joined the faculty at Queen's University at Kingston. He co-founded the clinical programme in the department of psychology.

He received his DSc in psychology from the University of London.

He was active in the Canadian Psychological Association, of which he became president in 1979.

Heritage
Queen's University established the James Inglis Prize, awarded annually to a graduating doctoral student with highest standing in the clinical programme.

Positions
 President, Canadian Psychological Association (1979)
 Honorary Life Fellow, Canadian Psychological Association

Publications
 Inglis, J., & Lawson, J.S. (1986). A Principal Components Analysis of the Kaufman Assessment Battery for Children (K-ABC): Implications for the Test Results of Children with Learning Disabilities. Journal of Learning Disabilities, 19(2), 80–85.
 Nichols, E.G., Inglis, J., Lawson, J.S., & MacKay, I. (1988). A Cross-Validation Study of Patterns of Cognitive Ability in Children with Learning Difficulties, as Described by Factorially Defined WISC-R Verbal and Performance IQs. Journal of Learning Disabilities, 21(8), 504–508. 
 Inglis J, Caird WK (1963) Age differences in successive responses to simultaneous stimulation. Canadian Journal of Psychology, 17: 98–105
 Inglis J, Sanderson RE (1961) Successive responses to simultaneous stimulation in elderly patients with memory disorder. Journal of  Abnormal & Social Psychology, 62: 709–712 
 Lawson, J.S., & Inglis, J. (1984). The Psychometric Assessment of Children with Learning Disabilities: An Index Derived from a Principal Components Analysis of the WISC-R. Journal of Learning Disabilities, 17(9),517-555.

References

Canadian psychologists
20th-century psychologists
Academic staff of Queen's University at Kingston
1999 deaths
Presidents of the Canadian Psychological Association